Baicheng Chang'an Airport  is an airport serving the city of Baicheng in China's northeastern Jilin Province. It is located in the town of Taohe in Taobei District,  from the city center. The airport received approval from the central government on October 14, 2012, and construction began on October 26, 2012. The total investment is 480 million yuan. The airport was opened on 31 March 2017, the fifth civil airport in Jilin province.

Facilities
The airport has a runway that is 2,500 meters long and 45 meters wide (class 4C), and a 4,471 square-meter terminal building. It is designed to handle 200,000 passengers and 700 tons of cargo annually by 2020.

Airlines and destinations

See also
List of airports in China
List of the busiest airports in China

References

Airports in Jilin
2017 establishments in China
Airports established in 2017